MTV is a British pay television channel focusing on reality TV and music programming operated by Paramount Networks UK & Australia.

The channel launched as part of MTV Networks Europe localisation strategy in 1997. MTV UK (previously MTV UK & Ireland; MTV One) was launched on 1 July 1997. The channel was set up to provide audiences with local artists and more relevant music content. Prior to the localisation of MTV in Europe, the region was served by MTV Europe which was launched on 1 August 1987. Since February 2011 MTV has been solely an entertainment channel.

The channel is in over 10 million homes in the UK and Ireland.

Availability
From its inception, MTV UK (then branded as MTV UK & Ireland) the network served United Kingdom and Ireland. For a short period the channel was made available free-to-air in New Zealand between July 1997 to June 1998
under a special agreement between TVNZ and MTV Networks Europe. The channel was broadcast on analogue from the Astra 1A satellite as part of the Sky Multichannels subscription package. In April 2001, the channel became a digital-only channel within the UK and Ireland.

History

1987–2001
MTV first became available in the UK when MTV Europe launched on 1 August 1987. On July 1, 1997, at 06:00 Western European time, MTV UK began broadcasting in the UK and Ireland. The first video clip shown on the air was "Three Lions" by The Lightning Seeds.

MTV UK & Ireland was launched on 1 July 1997 as part of MTV Networks Europe's regionalisation strategy. MTV launched a UK and Ireland specific channel to target existing competition within the market. MTV UK & Ireland launched with specialised content of hit MTV Europe shows which included the Euro Top 20, MTV Select, MTV News, MTV News Weekend Edition, Non-Stop Hits, US Top 20 Hitlist UK, Stylissimo, The Big Picture, Up 4 It and The Lick. The channel promoted mainly English-speaking music programming and music.

In 1999, MTV Networks Europe announced that it would expand its channel portfolio within the UK and Ireland. On 1 July 1999, MTV launched MTV Base and MTV Extra. MTV UK & Ireland also rebranded with a new schedule and on-air presentation.

2002–2010
In 2002, MTV began to air programming from MTV US, similar to other MTV channels in Europe. MTV began to drop some of its localised programming in favour of MTV US shows. These shows included Jackass, Date My Mom and Dismissed. Despite targeted efforts to play certain types of music videos in limited rotation, MTV greatly reduced its overall rotation of music videos throughout the first decade of the 2000s. While music videos dominated the channel in early 2000-2002 the rate of music rotation declined rapidly. Similar trends are noted on other European MTV channels and other sister networks in the US.

In July 2007, MTV in the UK was renamed to 'MTV One' with a major new branding launching across most of the MTV channels. MTV2 was renamed 'MTV Two' to follow the consistent branding across the channels. Promotion started on 1 July 2007 under the title 'MTV New 22.07.07'. The rebrand saw viewers engaging with the channel. In early 2009, it was announced that MTV One would be rebranded as simply MTV and the one-hour timeshift MTV One +1 as MTV +1 on 1 July 2009.

For most of 2008, MTV's main source of music video programming was based on its sister channels MTV Two, MTV Hits, MTV Dance, MTV Base and TMF. As of 2009 the only music based programming on MTV include MTV Push, MTV World Stage and MTV Iggy. These shows are produced by MTV Networks International and are shown on most MTV channels worldwide.

On 1 July 2009 MTV available in the UK and Ireland adopted MTV's global identity as part of MTV International. 64 MTV channels now share similar music and entertainment content and similar on-air and online branding. Part of the rebrand saw a 50/50 balance in the number of music based programming and reality based TV series that air on the channels.

From 2010, MTV increased its music output which has since been diluted by reality based television programmes. As part of a global strategy MTV music content with the launch of MTV World Stage and Friday Night Music, both shows helped to maintain MTV's audience figures.

2011–present
On 1 February 2011, MTV removed all music from the channel and moved it to newly launched channel MTV Music; the only music that remains is the occasional MTV Most Wanted strand. The channel became a general entertainment channel and was moved to the entertainment section of Sky's EPG at channel 126, with MTV +1 moving to 160. The move resulted in an increase in the channel's audience share of nearly 150% in the 6 weeks after the change, while viewing was down nearly 20% on Virgin Media during the same period, where the channel had yet to move. On 29 May 2013 MTV was moved to the entertainment section of Virgin Media's EPG on channel 134.

MTV was rebranded once again to the current logo on 1 July 2011, and began broadcasting in 16:9 widescreen at the same time. A high-definition simulcast of MTV launched on 13 February 2012 on Sky in the UK and Ireland.

In 2016, MTV started showing repeats of Big Brother UK in the UK, the day following its broadcast on Channel 5.

Presenters
 Becca Dudley (2012– current )
 Bluey Robinson (2012–2016)
 Laura Whitmore (2008–2016)

Programming

UK produced shows
 MTV News (1997-2019)
 Geordie Shore (2011–present)
 Ex on the Beach (2014–present)
 Teen Mom UK (2016–present)
 Just Tattoo of Us (2017–present)
 The Charlotte Show (2018–2019)
 True Love or True Lies (2018–2019)
 MTV Top 40 (2019)
 MTV Cribs UK (2019)
 Celebs on the Farm (2021–present) (moved from Channel 5)

Pan-European shows 
 Plain Jane
 MTV Movies
 MTV Push (2009–present)
 MTV World Stage (2009–present)
 Euro Top 20 (1990–2009)
 MTV Iggy (2008–2009)
 Crispy News (2009–2010)
 My Super Sweet 16
 Pimp My Ride
 Teen Dad
 MTV At The Movies

Former MTV UK & Ireland shows

Shows imported from MTV US

Other shows imported from US networks
 Acceptable.TV
 Blue Mountain State
 Drawn Together
 Pretty Little Liars
 Hellcats
 The Secret Life of the American Teenager
 South Park (2005–2013)
 Star (2018–present)
 The L.A. Complex
 The Fresh Prince of Bel-Air
 Audrina

Subsidiary and sister channels

MTV HD
On 13 February 2012, a high-definition simulcast of MTV called MTV HD launched.

MTV 90s

MTV 90s is a British pay television music channel owned by Paramount Networks UK & Australia that launched on 31 March 2022 replacing MTV Base. It was first launched as a temporary reband of MTV Classic from 27 May to 24 June 2016. The channel broadcasts music from the 1990s.

MTV 80s

MTV 80s is the British version of the international music TV channel MTV 80s, which began broadcasting on 31 March 2022, replacing MTV Classic. It was first launched as a temporary reband of MTV Classic from 28 February to 31 March 2020. The channel broadcasts music from the 1980s.

MTV Hits

Launched on 1 May 2001, MTV Hits is a channel which plays chart music videos.

MTV Music

Launched on 1 February 2011 - MTV Music broadcasts non-stop music videos, live performances and artist interviews.

MTV Live

Direct from Warsaw and broadcast throughout Europe, MTV Live is a 24-hour standard and high definition music and entertainment channel. The channel was rebranded from MTVNHD to MTV Live HD on 23 April 2012, gaining a standard definition simulcast at the same time. On 29 June 2016, MTV Live HD was replaced by Nick Jr. HD on Sky in the United Kingdom and Ireland but continues on Virgin Media.

MTV Ireland
MTV Ireland is an Irish opt-out feed of MTV UK that was launched on 22 February 2004. It features localised advertising and sponsorship for the Irish market. As of February 2019 the broadcasting licence is held by RTTV in the Czech Republic, moving from Ofcom in the UK.

Special events
MTV Resident in Dublin (November 1999)
MTV Crashes Dublin (March 2000)
MTV Presents: Street Performance World Championship 2009[5]
MTV Presents: Oxygen 2009
MTV @ Arthur's Guinness Day 2010
MTV Presents Live in Belfast 2010
MTV Music Week [Belfast) (November 2011)
MTV Crashes Derry-Londonderry (September 2014)
MTV Crashes Cork (November 2014)
MTV Club Tour (2014)
MTV Crashes Derry (Summer 2015)
Club MTV Tour (2018)

Defunct channels

MTV Extra

MTV Extra was launched in 1999 and was a mixture of music videos and repeats of MTV programming. Towards the end of the channel's life, programming was dropped and the channel showed solely music videos (under the "Pure Music" name), with MTV Dance in the evenings. MTV Dance was spun off into its own channel on 20 April 2001, and MTV Extra was renamed MTV Hits at 6am on 1 May 2001. MTV Extra is notable for being the only spin-off MTV channel to use the same song title graphics as its parent channel (although it had its own separate idents).

MTV Flux

Launched on 6 September 2006, MTV Flux allowed viewers to take "control" of the channel by sending in video clips to MTV Flux's website, and requesting music videos. It was replaced by MTV +1 on 1 February 2008, a timeshift service of MTV. MTV had announced that the "Flux" format would be integrated into its other channels, and so the website still remains.

MTV2

MTV2 was launched in 2002 replacing M2. The channel focused on rock and indie music and featured shows such as MTV2 Most Wanted and Gonzo. The channel was replaced with MTV Rocks on 1 March 2010.

MTV Shows

MTV's general entertainment channel featuring reruns and new episodes of MTV's reality shows. Formerly MTV R until 1 March 2010. The channel ceased operating from 1 February 2011. Its broadcast capacity was relocated to the Music section of the Sky guide for use as MTV Music.

MTV Dance

MTV Dance was the dedicated dance music channel with music videos and programming of underground and mainstream dance tracks. The channel was replaced with Club MTV on 23 May 2018.

MTV Rocks

MTV Rocks was a channel dedicated to alternative rock music, with other commercial mainstream music types found on MTV's other music channels. MTV Rocks was previously known as MTV Two and was replaced by MTV Rocks on 1 March 2010. MTV Two was previously MTV2 Europe and M2 respectively. The channel closed on 20 July 2020.

MTV OMG

Launched on 1 March 2018. MTV OMG was the channel for music and gossip, replacing Viva. The channel closed on 20 July 2020.

Club MTV

Launched on 23 May 2018. Club MTV was the channel plays dance, EDM and urban music, replacing MTV Dance. The channel closed on 20 July 2020.

MTV +1
Launched on 1 February 2008 at midday, this timeshift service of MTV replaced MTV Flux, which in turn had replaced VH2. Trailers for the channel had aired before and after the launch, highlighting the catch-up ability of the new channel. The channel was known as MTV One +1 between 1 February 2008 and 1 July 2009. Coinciding with the closures of MTV OMG, MTV Rocks and Club MTV on 20 July 2020, the timeshift channel also closed as part of this change, along with the timeshifts for MTV Music and Comedy Central Extra.

TMF

TMF was launched as a free-to-air television channel on Freeview on 30 October 2002 to compete against EMAP's The Hits (now 4Music). It originally started as a non-stop music channel, although the network featured more programming from MTV and its other sister channels from early 2004. The channel was replaced with Viva on 26 October 2009.

VH2

VH2 was launched in December 2003 and shown mainly music videos and live concerts. It focused on rock, indie and punk music and branded itself as 'the alternative to manufactured pop'. The channel closed on 1 August 2006 because the main source of income for the channel, ringtone advertising, had slowed down. MTV replaced VH2 with MTV Flux, which was in turn replaced with a timeshift version of MTV.

Viva

Launched on 26 October 2009, Viva was the new music and entertainment channel, which replaced TMF. The channel shown content from sister channels MTV and Comedy Central, as well as programmes from Nickelodeon and Spike, with some acquired content airing as well. As the only MTV channel sitting on the Freeview platform, it was MTV UK's highest-rating service. The channel unexpectedly closed on 31 January 2018.

VH1

VH1 was a channel targeted at 25- to 44-year-olds playing chart and popular music from the 1970s to the present day. It also carried music programming and themed countdown shows from their US counterpart. The channel closed on 7 January 2020.

MTV Base
MTV Base was a British pay television music channel from Paramount Networks UK & Australia that focused primarily on hip hop, R&B, grime, garage, reggae, funk, soul and dance music. MTV Base closed on 31 March 2022, and was replaced by MTV 90s.

MTV Classic
MTV Classic was a British pay television music channel from Paramount Networks UK & Australia. The channel was launched in the United Kingdom and Ireland on 1 July 1999 as VH1 Classic. It focused on music videos and music specials from the 1960s onwards, sometimes featuring music videos and concert footage from as early as at least the 1940s or 1950s, such as Bing Crosby's "White Christmas" from 1942. It also aired videos from the 2000s and early 2010s. Every November and December from 2013 until 2021, MTV Classic played Christmas-themed music branded as MTV Xmas. On 31 March 2022, the channel closed down, and was replaced by MTV 80s.

MTV on Pluto
Beginning in 2022, some MTV-branded channels began to appear on the British version of the Paramount-owned streaming platform Pluto TV - the move followed on from the establishment of similar streams on Pluto in other territories. The streams are, like the rest of the Pluto TV channels, available at no cost to viewers. As of March 2023, the available services included:
MTV Reality - screening episodes of MTV's reality shows. This is joined in the "MTV on Pluto" section of the guide by dedicated 'box-set' channels for specific programmes, including Catfish: The TV Show, 16 and Pregnant and Pimp My Ride
MTV Movie Hits - a stream of music videos drawn from film soundtracks, this was the first MTV-branded music channel on Pluto in Britain.
MTV Classic - a stream of archive music videos, reusing the name of the former MTV Classic broadcast channel which closed earlier in the year
MTV Love - a stream dedicated to love songs and ballads, which appeared in early 2023; whereas the previous pop-up MTV Love stunts on TV channels were run in proximity to Valentine's Day, this stream has remained available beyond the end of February. 
MTV Queens of Pop - playing music by female and female-led acts. Appeared in the run-up to International Women's Day in early March 2023. 

Former and temporary feeds have included:
MTV Christmas - a temporary channel in the run-up to the festive season, playing Christmas music videos. Not a simulcast of the MTV Xmas channel which had temporarily replaced MTV 90s on satellite and cable, though the two channels were running an essentially similar format.

Logos

Awards and nominations

See also
VH1 (Europe)
VH1 Classic Europe
MTV Dance (Europe)
MTV Hits (Europe)
MTV Rocks (Europe)
MTV Ireland
List of MTV channels
Viacom International Media Networks Europe

References

External links
 

MTV channels
Music video networks in the United Kingdom
Television channels and stations established in 1997
Television stations in Ireland
Television channel articles with incorrect naming style